Bertrand Toën (born September 17, 1973 in Millau, France) is a mathematician who works as a director of research at the Centre national de la recherche scientifique (CNRS) at the Paul Sabatier University, Toulouse, France. He received his PhD in 1999 from the Paul Sabatier University, where he was supervised by Carlos Simpson and Joseph Tapia.

Toën is a specialist of algebraic geometry. He his best known for his systematic use of homotopical methods in algebraic geometry. Together with Gabriele Vezzosi and Jacob Lurie he has laid the foundations of the subject of derived algebraic geometry and higher category theory. His works establish several contributions to noncommutative algebraic geometry in the sense of Kontsevich and (shifted) symplectic geometry.

He was an invited speaker at the International Congress of Mathematicians in 2014, speaking in the section on "Algebraic and Complex Geometry" with a talk  "Derived Algebraic Geometry and Deformation Quantization".

He was awarded an ERC Advanced Grant in 2016. In 2019 he received the Sophie Germain prize.

References

External links
Home page
Bertrand Toën at the Mathematics Genealogy Project

1973 births
Living people
French mathematicians
Research directors of the French National Centre for Scientific Research